The eighth season of Modern Family was ordered on March 3, 2016 by ABC. The season premiered on September 21, 2016. The season is produced by Steven Levitan Productions and Picador Productions in association with 20th Century Fox Television, with creators Steven Levitan and Christopher Lloyd as showrunners. The season concluded on May 17, 2017.

Cast

Main cast
 Ed O'Neill as Jay Pritchett 
 Sofía Vergara as Gloria Pritchett
 Julie Bowen as Claire Dunphy 
 Ty Burrell as Phil Dunphy 
 Jesse Tyler Ferguson as Mitchell Pritchett 
 Eric Stonestreet as Cameron Tucker 
 Sarah Hyland as Haley Dunphy 
 Ariel Winter as Alex Dunphy 
 Nolan Gould as Luke Dunphy 
 Rico Rodriguez as Manny Delgado
 Aubrey Anderson-Emmons as Lily Tucker-Pritchett
 Jeremy Maguire as Joe Pritchett

Recurring cast
 Fred Willard as Frank Dunphy
 Winston Duke as Dwight
 Nathan Fillion as Rainer Shine
 Joe Mande as Ben
 Dana Powell as Pam Tucker

Guest cast

 Stephanie Beatriz as Sonia Ramirez
 Celia Weston as Barb Tucker
 Ernie Hudson as Miles
 Christian Barillas as Ronaldo
 Martin Short as Merv Schechter
 Andy Daly as Principal Brown
 Robert Costanzo as Earl Chambers
 Joely Fisher as Maggie Braithwaite
 Kelsey Grammer as Keifth
 Shelley Long as DeDe Pritchett
 Elizabeth Banks as Sal
 Peyton Manning as Coach Gary
 Victor Garber as Chef Dumont
 Rob Riggle as Gil Thorpe
 Jane Krakowski as Dr. Donna Duncan
 Charles Barkley as himself
 DeAndre Jordan as himself
 Faith Prince as Lorraine
 Niecy Nash as Joan
 Reid Ewing as Dylan Marshall
 Benjamin Bratt as Javier Delgado
 Lindsey Kraft as Joey 
 Jackie Seiden as Dr. Elaine Kolchek
 Sedona Fuller as Betty Kolchek
 London Fuller as Janice Kolchek
 Nakia Seacrest as Vice Principal

Production
Modern Family was renewed for an eighth season on March 3, 2016, with several other ABC shows. Sofia Vergara shared a photo on Instagram of the cast doing a photo-shoot for the eighth season on July 26, 2016. The table read for the season occurred the same day, with filming beginning shortly after. The Hollywood Reporter announced on August 4, 2016, that Castle-alum Nathan Fillion had been cast in a recurring role of three episodes as the weatherman Rainer Shine. It was also announced that Martin Short will appear in a guest role in the third episode of the season as a promotional maven. A promotional poster was released on August 23, 2016. On September 26, 2016, Variety reported that Modern Family would feature the first openly transgender child actor on network-television. The 8-year old actor Jackson Millarker appeared in the second episode of the season as Lily's playmate Tom. "The Hollywood Reporter" reported on November 7, 2016 that Peyton Manning will guest star in the 12th episode of the season. "Manning will play Coach Gary, baby Joe's sports tutor, whom Gloria (Sofia Vergara) brings in to help teach Joe how to throw and catch. When Coach Gary also starts doing things around the house, Jay (Ed O'Neill) is left feeling a bit emasculated." Kelsey Grammer guest-starred in a January 2017 episode of the series, portraying Cam's ex-boyfriend Keifth. The Hollywood Reporter reported that NBA stars Charles Barkley and DeAndre Jordan will guest-star in a late January 2017 episode, playing themselves. The source stated "For their part in the show, Barkley and Jordan will be attending a charity basketball game that Phil (Ty Burrell) has been training all year for in an attempt to redeem himself after a disastrous turn at the previous year's game.  When they both start getting a little too involved, Phil tries to not buckle under the pressure."

Episodes

Ratings

References

External links
 

2016 American television seasons
2017 American television seasons
8